Birla Institute of Technology and Science, Pilani – Hyderabad Campus (shortened to BITS Pilani, Hyderabad Campus or BPHC) is a private deemed university campus located in Hyderabad, India. It is one of the four constituent campuses of the BITS Pilani university which has been declared as the Institute of Eminence by the Government of India. BITS Pilani opened its campus in Hyderabad upon invitation by the Government of Andhra Pradesh in 2008 with the first batch of campus graduating in 2012. It is a technical and research institute with focus on Engineering and Sciences.

History

Early days

The Hyderabad Campus' foundation stone was laid in the presence of the then Chief Minister of the State Y.S. Rajasekhara Reddy on 27 April 2007. The institute became a functioning entity in 2008.

BITS also runs a virtual university and an extension centre in Bangalore, Chennai and several important cities of India to cater to the academic needs of Industry.

Expansion
BITS Pilani, Hyderabad Campus is to eventually have ten centres in order to step up activities in research and development in pharmaceutics, mechanics, computer technology and construction engineering.

Out of all the campuses of the BITS Pilani university, the Hyderabad campus is the one which has taken charge of developing a course for Electronics and Communications Engineering. This is because of the campus's presence in Hyderabad, which is notable for a large talent pool in this area. The Goa campus started offering Electronics & Communication Engineering from the academic year 2017–18.

Academics

Admission 
Since 2005, admission to the Undergraduate programmes to the Indian campuses of BITS has been offered to students based on their performance in the all-India Entrance Examination, called BITS Admission Test (BITSAT). BITS Pilani also has the policy of accepting State and National Board toppers from India. From 2015, the institute also started accepting international students on the basis of performance in the SAT Subject Tests in Physics, Chemistry, and Math II followed by an interview.  BITS does not implement any State-based or caste/religion based quotas during admission.

Research and development projects

The college has many R&D projects under its departments. These projects take the form of research-based consultancy, sponsored projects or just independent R&D. Some collaborators include the Science and Engineering Research Council (DST-SERC), the University Grants Commission (UGC), the National Programme for Micro and Smart System (NPMASS), AstraZeneca, etc. The funding for these projects runs into several crores. The culmination of some of this research has led to the granting of patents to professors.

Campus

Second phase of construction
The foundation stone for the second phase of campus development was laid by the IT Minister of Telangana, K. T. Rama Rao on 20 February 2016 and the state allocated additional  to the institute to facilitate its phase-II expansion plans making it the largest physical campus of BITS Pilani. The architect for the campus is Hafeez Contractor.

Events

Pearl

Pearl is held in March and features competitions in quiz, music, dance and literary events. The first Pearl was held in 2010. The second edition of Pearl in February 2011 was headlined by the Swedish death metal band, Dark Tranquillity. Thurisaz, a metal band from Belgium, performed at Pearl 2012. In 2013, Pearl saw performances by Junkyard Groove, Amplifier and Nikhil Chinappa.

ATMOS

ATMOS is the Techno-Management Fest of the campus. The First edition was organized on 26 and 27 October 2012 and featured Paper presentations, Technical competitions and Workshops on various disciplines. The next edition was scheduled from 11 October to 13 October 2013. ATMOS aims at improving the technical culture among Indian colleges as well as providing a platform to showcase their abilities. In its eighth year now, ATMOS is growing rapidly with participation from students, academicians, entrepreneurs and speakers from all over India. Each year, a diverse range of challenging and educative Quizzes, Competitions, Case studies, Workshops and Conferences are held, along with interactive sessions with renowned speakers from across the Country.

The fest has also received patronage from the Government initiative Make in India. BITSMUN Hyderabad and Enigma-The National quiz are held during ATMOS and are few of the highlights. The newest addition, the Tech Expo witnessed wide participation from innovators and thinkers from all across the Country.

Arena
Arena is the national annual sports festival of the campus. The major tournaments it features are cricket, hockey football, throwball, basketball, badminton, table tennis, chess, carrom, athletics, tennis, volleyball and power lifting.

TEDxBITSHyderabad
The first edition of TEDxBITSHyderabad was held on 25 November 2012. There were a total of 12 speakers, including the four student speakers selected by a panel.

Verba Maximus
Two editions of the Literary fest, Verba Maximus, have taken place until now. The first was in 2012, the second in 2013. The fest offers a host of events, all literary in nature, as well as visits by authors and other notable literary figures. Verba Maximus 2013 saw a visit by bestselling author of the Shiva Trilogy, Amish Tripathi. The fest has traditionally ended with a comedy show. Both editions of Verba Maximus have featured Saurabh Pant.

While most of the fest is organised by ELAS, the 2014 version of the fest has seen ELAS collaborating with the Journal Club, the Photography Club, the Hindi Club, Brindavanam (Telugu Association) and the Quiz Club.

MUN
From BITSMUN 2011, the first college level Model United Nations Conference in the state BITSMUN 2013 grew into an international MUN conference with over 200 delegates shortlisted from 700 applications.

Departments

Biological Sciences
The Department of Biological Sciences offers M.Sc. (Hons.) Biological Sciences, M.E. Biotechnology and Ph.D. in BioSciences academic programs. The department is DST-FIST funded and has received DST-PURSE and DBT-builder grants. The department has 18 faculty members including recipients of DBT-Ramalingaswami Re-Entry fellows, DST-Ramanujan fellows, and DBT-Wellcome trust fellows. The faculty members get funding from all the government funding agencies across India for performing research in different areas ranging from virology to plant biotechnology.

Chemical Engineering

Chemistry

Civil Engineering

Computer Science and Information Systems

Economics and Finance

Electrical & Electronics Engineering

Humanities and Social Sciences

Mathematics

Mechanical Engineering

Pharmacy

Physics

Administration
It is one of the constituent campuses of BITS Pilani Therefore, graduating students are awarded degrees from BITS Pilani.

The administration is divided into eight divisions:
 Faculty Affairs
 Sponsored Research and Consultancy
 International Programmes and Collaboration
 Practice School
 Student Welfare Division (SWD)
 Academic - Undergraduate Studies
 Academic - Graduate Studies and Research
 Alumni Relations

Other campuses of BITS Pilani
 Dubai Campus
 Goa Campus
 Pilani Campus
 Mumbai Campus

References

External links

Pearl annual Cultural festival of BITS-Pilani Hyderabad Campus
ARENA annual Sports festival of BITS-Pilani Hyderabad Campus
ATMOS annual Techno Management Festival of BITS-Pilani Hyderabad Campus
The Daily Bitsian
BITS Embryo

 
Engineering colleges in Hyderabad, India
Hyderabad
University and college campuses in India
2008 establishments in Andhra Pradesh
Educational institutions established in 2008